Kashif Hameed (born December 21, 1977) is a former American professional basketball player who played college basketball for Iona.

References

External links 
Career stats at Proballers.com
Iona Hall of Fame profile
Iona Gaels bio
 French league stats

1977 births
Living people
African-American basketball players
American expatriate basketball people in France
American expatriate basketball people in North Macedonia
American expatriate basketball people in Portugal
American expatriate basketball people in Switzerland
American men's basketball players
Basketball players from New York City
FC Porto basketball players
Fribourg Olympic players
Iona Gaels men's basketball players
JL Bourg-en-Bresse players
KK Rabotnički players
Power forwards (basketball)
Sportspeople from Schenectady, New York
21st-century African-American sportspeople
20th-century African-American sportspeople